Psilocybe banderillensis is a species of psilocybin mushroom in the family Hymenogastraceae known from the states of Veracruz and Oaxaca in Mexico. It is in the Psilocybe fagicola complex with Psilocybe fagicola, Psilocybe oaxacana, Psilocybe columbiana, Psilocybe herrerae, Psilocybe keralensis, Psilocybe neoxalapensis, and Psilocybe teofiloi.

See also
List of Psilocybe species
List of psilocybin mushrooms

References

Entheogens
Psychoactive fungi
banderillensis
Psychedelic tryptamine carriers
Fungi of North America
Fungi described in 1978
Taxa named by Gastón Guzmán